Towcestrians Sports Club (Towcestrians) is a British sports club based in Towcester, Northamptonshire. It was founded in 1933 as a rugby union club, and subsequently extended its scope to cricket, hockey, tennis, and softball.

History 
Old Towcestrians Rugby Club was founded in 1933 by "old boys" of Towcester Grammar School (now Sponne School Technology College). In the following summer Old Towcestrians Cricket Club was formed and included many members from the rugby club in the market town of Towcester.

The two clubs operated independently until the mid-1960s with rugby being played in the centre of Towcester whilst cricket used the school pitch, pavilion and canteen for teas. In 1967 negotiations were begun with Hesketh Estates regarding the availability of land and the rugby and cricket committees began work on the constitution for a combined ‘open’ club.

In February 1968 the joint committees agreed a 30-year lease with Hesketh Estates for 9 acres of land ground off the Greens Norton Road. In March of the same year a special meeting approved the amalgamation of the two clubs into Towcestrians Rugby and Cricket Club under the chairmanship of Colin Waklelin. Although Old Towcestrians Tennis Club originally started in 1925 they joined the new club later in the summer of 1968.

In August 1969 planning approval was granted for the development of the new facilities and construction work begun on the club house and ground. One year later, in August 1970, the new ground was opened.

The Hockey club joined in 1982 and played on a grass pitch till new Hockey rules forced them to play on artificial pitches in Northampton.

Towcestrians Softball started in 2014 as Towcester Tigers playing at Towcestrians.

Sports

Rugby

Senior Rugby
Towcestrians senior rugby consists of Towcestrians 1st XV, 2nds and 3rds with a Mini and Junior Section. Towcestrians 1st XV saw promoted in 2016 and will start their 2016-2017 season in National 3 Midlands. 2016 also saw Towcestrians 1st XV win the Lewis Shield on 19 April 2016  with a 19 - 34 comprehensive win over Bletchley RFC at Franklins Gardens Northampton. 

Ladies Rugby

Towcester Roses are one of the newest additions to the club's teams; Ladies, young and old, from the surrounding area play in the NC3 South Midlands League.

Mini and Juniors Rugby
Towcestrians Mini & Junior Section caters for young players from the ages of 6 up to 17, organised into year groups with some year groups having more than one team. Coaching sessions are held on Sunday mornings (10am - 12 noon), games/matches are scheduled throughout the year according to the structured season.

Tennis
Towcestrians Tennis have three flood lit all weather tennis courts offering playing facilities all year round. Activities include 5 teams playing in local leagues, Social Play, Junior Coaching and Summer Camps.

Cricket
Towcestrians Cricket caters for Senior and Junior cricket with the Senior XI winning promotion to SNCL Division 2 in 2015 with a game in hand. Cricket is played at Towcestrians and winter nets at Sponne School with notable players such as Graeme Swann.

Hockey
Towcestrians Hockey currently have 2 men, 5 lady, juniors and a mixed team.

Softball
Towcester Tigers backed up by GB player Alex Reynolds he has also been selected by Baseball/Softball UK for the Youth Sports Trust National Talent Camp for coaching/umpire. After her first season Laura Simpson has tried for Softball Academy and has been accepted into High Performance Academy, and Youth Sports Trust National Talent Camp as a softball player.  She has also been asked to represent GB in the Netherlands in January 2016 at an Indoor softball tournament and selected as eligible for trials for the GB women’s team to play at the world championships in Canada in July.

References

Rugby clubs established in 1933
Rugby union in Northamptonshire
1933 establishments in England